North Church Cemetery is a cemetery located in Hardyston Township in Sussex County, in the US state of New Jersey.

Notable burials
 Samuel Fowler (1779–1844), who served in the House of Representatives from 1833 to 1837.
 Samuel Fowler (1851–1919), represented New Jersey's 4th congressional district from 1893–1895.
 Daniel Haines (1801–1877) 14th Governor of New Jersey, from 1843 to 1845, and from 1848 to 1851.
 John Linn (1763–1821) was a U.S. Representative from New Jersey from 1817 to 1821.

References

External links
 North Church Cemetery / North Hardyston Cemetery at The Political Graveyard
 North Hardyston Cemetery at Find A Grave

Cemeteries in Sussex County, New Jersey
Hardyston Township, New Jersey